Hochelaga (formerly known as Sainte-Marie and Montreal—Sainte-Marie) is a federal electoral district in Quebec, Canada, that has been represented in the House of Commons of Canada from 1867 to 1988 and since 2004.

Geography
The district includes the neighbourhood of Hochelaga-Maisonneuve and the western part of the neighbourhood of Longue-Pointe in the Borough of Mercier–Hochelaga-Maisonneuve, the eastern part of the neighbourhood of Rosemont in the Borough of Rosemont–La Petite-Patrie and the eastern part of the neighbourhood of Centre-Sud in the Borough of Ville-Marie.

Political geography
Until 2011, this working class riding strongly favoured the Bloc, which in 2008, won most polls.

The New Democrats placed second in the 2009 by-election; as in much of Quebec, Bloc support collapsed in the 2011 election and the New Democrats swept the riding.

Demographics
According to the Canada 2006 Census

 Ethnic groups: 83.5% White, 4.5% Black, 2.8% Latin American, 2.5% Arab, 2.2% Chinese, 1.9% Southeast Asian, 1.0% South Asian
 Religions: (2001) 80.9% Catholic, 3.1% Protestant, 2.2% Muslim, 1.4% Buddhist, 1.4% Christian Orthodox, 9.4% No religion
 Average income: $20,781

According to the Canada 2016 Census
 Twenty most common mother tongue languages (2016) :  75.8% French, 4.1% Spanish, 3.7% Arabic, 3.6% English, 1.5% Portuguese, 1.4% Italian, 1.1% Creole languages, 1.1% Vietnamese, 0.9% Kabyle, 0.8% Mandarin, 0.6% Cantonese, 0.5% Russian, 0.5% Romanian, 0.4% Polish, 0.3% Bengali, 0.3% Ukrainian, 0.3% Greek, 0.2% Khmer, 0.2% Farsi, 0.2% Tamil, 0.2% Lingala

History
The electoral district of Hochelaga was created in 1867 covering the entire eastern part of the Island of Montreal. In 1976, it was renamed "Sainte-Marie". In 1981, it was renamed "Montreal—Sainte-Marie".

The riding was abolished in 1987 when it was redistributed into Laurier—Sainte-Marie and Rosemont ridings.

"Hochelaga" riding was recreated in 2003 from parts of Hochelaga—Maisonneuve and Laurier—Sainte-Marie ridings.

This riding lost territory to Laurier—Sainte-Marie and Saint-Léonard—Saint-Michel, and gained territory from La Pointe-de-l'Île and Honoré-Mercier during the 2012 electoral redistribution.

Members of Parliament
This riding has elected the following Members of Parliament:

Election results

Hochelaga, 2004 - present

Montreal—Sainte-Marie, 1984 - 1988

Sainte-Marie, 1979 - 1984

Hochelaga, 1867 - 1979

|-

| style="width: 160px"|Nationalist
|Léopold Doyon
|align=right|2,003
|align=right|31.90
|align=right|
|-

See also
 List of Canadian federal electoral districts
 Past Canadian electoral districts

References

Campaign expense data from Elections Canada
Riding history from the Library of Parliament:
Hochelaga 1867-1976
Sainte-Marie 1976-1981
Montreal—Sainte-Marie 1981-1987
Hochelaga 2004-present

Notes

Federal electoral districts of Montreal
Mercier–Hochelaga-Maisonneuve
Rosemont–La Petite-Patrie
Ville-Marie, Montreal